Princess Anna Amalia of Prussia (9 November 1723 – 30 March 1787) was an early modern German composer and music curator who served as princess-abbess of Quedlinburg. She was a princess of Prussia as the daughter of Frederick William I of Prussia and the sister of Frederick the Great.

early life (1723–1755) 

Princess Anna Amalia of Prussia was born on 9 November 1723 in Berlin, Kingdom of Prussia as the 12th child and 7th daughter of King Frederick William I (1688–1740) and his wife, born Princess Sophia Dorothea of Hanover (1687–1757). She had 13 siblings, 10 of whom survived infancy, including the future Frederick the Great (1712–1786). The Prussian royal children were raised in Berlin, where they lived in the Royal Palace (Königliches Schloss; today Berlin Palace/Berliner Schloss), but they also regularly spent time in the king's favourite residence, a jagdschloss ("hunting lodge") in Königs Wusterhausen.

Amalia was musically inclined, just like Crown Prince Frederick, but her formal instruction was only possible after the death of their abusive father who considered music to be decadent. Frederick William had an unpredictable temper, often dragging her across a room by her hair in a rage. Amalia's childhood was overshadowed by her father: described as an uneducated, unpolished and spartan soldier, he was an alcoholic whose favourite hobby was smoking pipes with commoners, an extremely pious and narrow-minded Calvinist who loved his wife and was faithful to her, but behaved violently towards his whole family, courtiers, and anyone who upset him.

He preferred a simple life and only enjoyed German food and culture, detesting everything French. He thought that women are for breeding only and have to be completely submissive to their husbands. On the other hand, Queen Sophia Dorothea was a well-educated and ambitious woman who enjoyed theatre and balls and loved French culture and fashion. She entrusted the care of her children to a French staff, to which the king could not object as French was the language of international diplomacy. Music became Amalia's secret consolation. She was first taught by Crown Prince Frederic with the support of their mother, and learned to play the harpsichord, the flute, and the violin.

The king was especially cruel to the crown prince as he considered his passion for music, literature and French culture unmanly. After many beatings and much humiliation, Frederick attempted to flee to their mother's family in England in 1730, but was captured and court-martialed. For her part in the escape attempt, the king almost beat his eldest daughter Princess Wilhelmine (1709–1758) to death. Amalia was 7 years old at the time. In May 1740, Frederick William II died and Amalia's eldest brother succeeded him as Frederick II.

Suggested marriage (1743–1744) 
After Prince Adolf Frederick of Holstein-Gottorp (1710–1771) was elected heir of the childless king of Sweden, Frederick I in 1743, Prussia, Russia, and Sweden pursued an alliance. A marriage was suggested between the new Swedish crown prince and either Amalia or her elder sister Louisa Ulrika (1720–1782). Their brother King Frederick thought that Louisa Ulrika was too ambitious to be a good queen in a relatively powerless monarchy as Sweden was then in the Age of Liberty (1720–1772), a period of parliamentary governance. He described Amalia as mild and good-hearted and thus more suitable for the role. It has been suggested that he believed that Amalia would be easier to control as a Prussian agent in the Swedish court. However, the Swedish envoy preferred Louisa Ulrika, and she was married by proxy in July 1744.

Abbess, composer, and music curator (1755–1787) 

In 1755, after the death of the previous abbess, Duchess Marie Elisabeth of Schleswig-Holstein-Gottorp (1678–1755), Amalia was elected princess-abbess of the Free Secular Imperial Abbey of Quedlinburg (German: Kasierlich Freie Weltliche Reichsstift Quedlinburg), which made her a wealthy and influential woman with the right to sit and speak in the Imperial Diet. She spent most of her time in Berlin and devoted herself to music, becoming known as a patron and composer. In 1758, she started studying music theory and composition from Johann Kirnberger(1721–1783), a student of Johann Sebastian Bach.

She achieved modest fame and is most known for her chamber music, including trios, marches, cantatas, songs, and fugues. Her favourite among her own compositions was the passion cantata Der Tod Jesu ("The Death of Jesus"), based on a poem by Karl Wilhelm Ramler. Only a few of her works have survived and she may have destroyed many of her own compositions, as she described herself as very timid and self-critical. More compositions by her may surface as a result of the 2000 discovery of the archives of the Sing-Akademie zu Berlin in Kyiv which had been lost since World War II.

Amalia also collected music, preserving over 600 volumes by Johann Sebastian Bach, George Frideric Handel, Georg Philipp Telemann, Carl Heinrich Graun and Carl Philipp Emanuel Bach, among others. Her library was split between East Germany and West Germany after World War II and reunited after the German reunification of 1990. Today it is housed in the Berlin State Library.

Princess-abbess Anna Amalia died on 30 March 1787 at the age of 63 and was buried in Berlin Cathedral. She was succeeded by her niece, Princess Sophia Albertina of Sweden (1753–1829).

Selected compositions

Sonata in F Major (for Flute and Basso Continuo) (1771) 
I. Adagio, II. Allegretto, III. Allegro ma non troppo

Her flute sonata is maybe Amalia's most well-known composition. It has a duration of about 11 minutes.

Harpsichord Concerto in G major 
I. Allegro, G minor, II. Andantino, C major, III. Allegro, G major

The concerto is scored for solo harpischord, 2 flutes, 2 oboes, 2 bassoons, and strings. It is written for a chamber orchestra and can be played with as few as one person per part, with a duration of around 13 minutes. It has a well-integrated solo part, and the second movement is mainly orchestral. The finale resembles a minuet with a trio featuring wind solos.

Divertimento in B-flat major (circa 1780) 
I. Adagio, B-flat major, II. Allegro, B flat major

The divertimento shows a possible influence by Mozart and might be the first chamber music featuring a clarinet. It opens with a tutti part and is then lead by the viola.

Ancestry

References

Bibliography

External links 

 2021 radio programme containing music by Princess-abbess Anna Amalia on BBC Radio 3's The Early Music Show, hosted by Hannah French

1723 births
1787 deaths
House of Hohenzollern
Prussian princesses
Abbesses of Quedlinburg
18th-century classical composers
Women classical composers
Musicians from Berlin
Burials at Berlin Cathedral
Daughters of kings